Conquest is the first album by the Canadian hip hop duo Dragon Fli Empire, released in 2004 on Makebelieve Records. Although the 2004 release is officially considered DFE's first album, there was a locally circulated CD-R version released in June 2002. The 2004 version replaced three tracks from the CD-R version with new ones: "D-E-F", "From Under" and "Beauty Full 2.0". The album is most notable for the popular track "Mount Pleasant", a song about Teekay's observations while riding Calgary Transit.

Music video
Only one video was made for the album. "Beauty Full" was filmed around Calgary in late 2002 and cameos are made by several emcees in Alberta's underground hip hop community.

Track listing

References

2004 albums
Dragon Fli Empire albums